The Duke of Kingston's Regiment of Light Horse was a volunteer cavalry regiment raised in Nottinghamshire in 1745 by the Duke at his own expense, in imitation of hussars in foreign service, and disbanded in 1746.

It was raised by the 2nd Duke of Kingston, ranked as the 10th Horse, and offered for service in the Jacobite rising of 1745, where it fought at Culloden. Since they were newly raised and the troopers weren't regulars they behaved in a less disciplined manner, especially in the pursuit after Culloden when they cut down some innocent civilians including women and children along the Inverness road, while pursuing the retreating Jacobites.

The men had enlisted for the duration of the fighting, and so the regiment was disbanded at Nottingham in September 1746, with the Duke of Cumberland enlisting most of the men (all but eight of the original) into the newly formed Duke of Cumberland's Regiment of Light Dragoons.

References

"On the institution of light cavalry", p. xx, in Historical record of the fourteenth, or the King's, regiment of Light Dragoons, by Richard Cannon. London: Parker, Furnivall. 1847. Digitised copy
p. 28, The Jacobite Rebellions 1689-1745, by Michael Barthorp & Gerry Embleton. Osprey Publishing. 1982. 

Cavalry regiments of the British Army
1745 establishments in Great Britain
Military units and formations disestablished in 1746
Military units and formations established in 1745
1746 disestablishments in Great Britain